Beyond the Blue Neon is the ninth studio album by American country music artist George Strait and 12th overall. It was released by MCA Records on February 6, 1989. It is certified platinum by the RIAA, and it produced the singles "Baby's Gotten Good at Goodbye", "What's Going on in Your World", "Ace in the Hole", and "Overnight Success". While the first three singles all reached Number One on the Billboard country charts in 1989, "Overnight Success" was a #8 for Strait in 1990. "Hollywood Squares" also charted at #67 in 1990 based on unsolicited airplay.

Content
Two of this album's tracks were previously recorded by other artists, while two more were later covered by others. "Leavin's Been Comin' (For a Long, Long Time)" was originally cut by Gene Watson on 1983's Little By Little, and the title track was originally recorded by its co-writer, Larry Boone, on his 1988 Swingin' Doors, Sawdust Floors (the title of which also references this song). In addition, "Oh Me, Oh My, Sweet Baby" was later recorded by Diamond Rio on their 1992 album Close to the Edge, from which it was released as a single. Finally, David Ball covered "What's Going On in Your World" on his 2007 album Heartaches by the Number.

Track listing

Personnel
George Strait - lead vocals
Curtis "Mr. Harmony" Young, Liana "Mrs. Harmony" Young - background vocals
Eddie Bayers - drums
David Hungate - bass guitar
Reggie Young, Steve Gibson - electric guitar
Paul Franklin - steel guitar
Steve Marsh - saxophone
Floyd Domino - piano
Johnny Gimble - fiddle
Steve Gibson - acoustic guitar

Production
Bob Bullock - engineer
Ron Treat - engineer
Tim Kish - engineer
Russ Martin - engineer
John Guess - mixer
Julian King - engineer
Sheila Mann - engineer
Milan Bogdan - digital editing
Don Lanier - pre-production
Jessie Noble - projection coordinator
Robert Jones - design
Steven Pumphrey - photography

Charts

Weekly charts

Year-end charts

Certifications

References

1989 albums
George Strait albums
MCA Records albums
Albums produced by Jimmy Bowen